Scotscalder railway station is a railway station located in the Highland council area in the far north of Scotland. It serves several rural hamlets in the historic county of Caithness, including Scotscalder, Olgrinmore, Westerdale and Calder.
 
It has a single platform which is long enough to accommodate a four-carriage train.

The station is managed by ScotRail, who operate all trains serving the station.

History

The station was opened by the Sutherland and Caithness Railway on 28 July 1874.

In 1988 the station house was sold by the British Railways Board for conversion to a residential dwelling. Following the conversion, in 1993, the station house was sold again and renovated further, for which the owner won the Ian Allan Railway Heritage Award. The station house was used as a holiday home during this period, but was available to rent for short periods. The station house is now a private residence and is no longer available to rent or open to the public.

Facilities 
The station has minimal facilities, including bike racks, a help point and a small waiting shelter. As there are no facilities to purchase tickets, passengers must buy one in advance, or from the guard on the train.

On , Transport Scotland introduced a new "Press & Ride" system at the station on a trial basis. Previously, passengers wishing to board a train at Scotscalder had to flag the train by raising their arm (as is still done at other request stops around the country); this meant that the driver had to reduce the train's speed before a request stop (to look out for any potential passengers on the platform and be able to stop if necessary), even if the platform was empty. The new system consists of an automatic kiosk (with a button for passengers to press) at the platform; this will alert the driver about any waiting passengers in advance and, if there is no requirement to stop, the train can maintain line speed through the station, thus improving reliability on the whole line.

Passenger volume 

Owing to its geographical remoteness, limited services and lengthy journey times, Scotscalder's patronage is extremely low: the station has not seen more than 500 passengers in a year since at least the 2002–03 financial year. In 2017–18 the station only saw 182 passengers, making it the 12th least-used railway station in Britain and the least-used on the Far North Line. In 2018–19 the patronage increased to 238, making Scotscalder the second least-used station on the line (behind ) and the 15th least-used in Britain.

The statistics cover twelve month periods that start in April.

Services
(There is a fourth train bound for Inverness but it is not scheduled to call at Scotscalder.) On Sundays there is just one train per day each way.

This station is designated as a request stop. This means that passengers intending to alight must inform the guard in advance, and any passengers wishing to board must press a "request" button located at the kiosk on the platform.

References

Bibliography

External links

RAILSCOT article on Sutherland and Caithness Railway
RAILSCOT page on Scotscalder
Scotscalder Request Stop video

Railway stations in Caithness
Railway stations served by ScotRail
Railway request stops in Great Britain
Low usage railway stations in the United Kingdom
Railway stations in Great Britain opened in 1874
Former Highland Railway stations